Origin of Dazzle is Dazzle Vision's first album. It was released on November 4, 2006 through Human Noise.

Style
"Origin of Dazzle" is known to take influence from screamo, Maiko's vocals in particular sounding reminiscent to much screamo of the time. Maiko's overall view of the album was "I think that we wanted to make a strong impression on the music scene. We didn't want to sound like any other band out there, we shot for the stars." Leading to the band being dubbed screamo, J-pop, alternative metal, post-hardcore and forerunners of kawaii metal.

Track listing

References

2006 debut EPs
Dazzle Vision albums